Xuân Định is a commune (xã) in Xuân Lộc District, Vietnam.

Hamlets
Thái Xuân is a hamlet within Xuân Định, in proximity to Saigon. It was founded in 1954 by Father John Chinh Tran, a Catholic priest, in what was South Vietnam at the time. Chinh founded it with peasants who had fled North Vietnam. The group, who were Catholic, were from Thái Bình Province. Due to the Xuân Lộc location and the Thái Bình origin, the hamlet was named "Thái Xuân".

After the Vietnam War lead to the disestablishment of South Vietnam, many Catholic refugees arrived in the United States. In Houston, Chinh founded Thai Xuan Village as a new community, and named it after the old village. As of 2005, 99% of the residents of Thai Xuan have remained as Roman Catholics.

Hamlets
Bảo Thị is a hamlet within Xuân Định.

References

Communes of Đồng Nai province
Populated places in Đồng Nai province